Robert Mulliner (died June 21, 1863) was an African American itinerant laborer in Newburgh, New York.  On June 21, 1863, Mulliner was violently dragged out from a courthouse jail and was then beaten by mob of 50 Irishmen who later hanged Mulliner from a tree.  Mulliner was jailed after allegedly raping an Irishwoman by the name of Ellen Clark.

Background

Enrollment Act

The Enrollment Act, also known as the Conscription Act was established in March 1863. The Confederate Army was the first to resort to a federal draft known as the Confederate Conscription Acts 1862–1864, as a means to regain the weakened man power lost in the Civil War. The Union followed suit as Abraham Lincoln passed the Enrollment Act, to enlist men in order to raise an, "effective army." These acts specifically targeted white men between the ages of 25-35 and those who were unmarried would range from 25-45.  While the act did not specifically state that black people were exempt from this draft it only called for, "able-bodied white citizens."  This in turn, further enraged poor whites, particularly, Irish-Americans and Irish immigrants. The Irish community viewed this draft as an opportunity for African American to steal their jobs given the influx of migrants in New York, therefore the hatred against African Americans escalated. Though, this hatred was also directed towards the Republican Party, as the Irish community resented the idea that the Republicans and Abolitionists fought more for African Africans over them. 

The Irish community often felt marginalized by the Republican Party and Republican newspapers as demonstrated through a skirmish between African American longshoremen and Irish longshoremen that occurred on April 13, 1863.  A Republican newspaper, The Daily Tribune described how the quarrel was between Irishmen and African Americans, "A few, unoffending colored laborers on the wharves were suddenly attacked by two or three hundred Irishmen." Meanwhile The Herald, a Democratic newspaper portrayed the attack between white and black laborers, "It appears that about a dozen negroes were engaged in discharging cargo..when several white laborers attacked them." The distinct portrayals showcase the underlying frustrations of the Irish being viewed as solely Irish and not white. This constant mistreatment from the Republican Party created an incentive for the Irish to support the Democratic Party as they felt equal and shared an anti-black and pro-slavery stance.

Lynching
It is unclear as to how Clarke and Mulliner encountered one another, however, multiple accounts of the incident indicate that Clarke had recently moved from County Heath to where Mulliner was living.  Mulliner was supposedly living in a black settlement outside of the city and  had previously been arrested and jailed for petty crimes such as theft.

On June 19, 1863, Robert Mulliner had been arrested on the charge of raping Clarke.  When the news broke out, it enraged the Irish community, and even more so when reportedly, a couple of Irish mobsters had personally known Clarke's parents in Ireland.  This only further influenced the Irish community to come together and seek vengeance against Mulliner. 

A few days later on June 21, 1863, a mob of around 50 Irishmen and the support of over hundreds of other Irish residents, surrounded the courthouse that Mulliner was being held in.  The mob demanded Mulliner be handed over as they ignored the pleas of the two judges, a parish priest by the name of E. J. O’Reilly, and a district attorney to "let the law take its course."  While these people attempted to dissuade the mob from killing Mulliner, it was to no avail. The mob eventually overpowered the courthouse by pushing through with the axes and sledges.  Once inside the mob forcibly pulled Mulliner out of his cell and dragged him outside.  Mulliner was violently beat while the mob was in the process of dragging him out. Once outside, Mulliner was hanged on a tree just outside in the courthouse yard for all to see.  It is unclear as to how long Mulliners' body was left on the tree but reportedly, "hundreds visited the scene of the lynching the next day."

Aftermath
Mulliner's death provoked many African Americans to flee New York as they feared the current ethnic tensions would only continue to arise.  Though, for the Irish community, this lynching further united one another as they pledged to "stand by each other." 

Following the death of Mulliner, Republican and Democratic newspapers attempted to pin the blame on one another for influencing the Irish community to commit this lynching.  The Daily Tribune, placed the blame on several Irish-American leaders, William McCleary and Cornelius McClean for allowing the lynching to take place.  However, the Democratic paper  The Daily Telegraph argued that Mulliners' murder would have been justified had he not been arrested beforehand given that it would not go against the law.   The editor argued that offenses such as rape are not punished effectively by the state, thus the actions of the mob were valid given the frustrations over, "the inadequacy of our laws."  Though the Republican Journal, refuted this by highlighting the fact that this lynching was not correct as it occurred whilst Mulliner was in custody, therefore, adhering against the due process law.  With this back and forth between the papers it only heightened the political unrest, however, this would only be the start of what was to come.

The Enrollment Act that Abraham Lincoln had passed, had not yet taken effect in New York as those Democratic politicians who opposed the draft, had prevented it from being passed in New York. Different factions of the Democratic known as the Peace or Copperhead faction believed that the Republican party was at fault for the thousands of casualties in the Civil War.  As a result they created a movement called the Peace Movement in an attempt to prevent the draft selection in New York and maintain the peace.  This however, was unsuccessful as Lincoln ordered the troops in New York to advance across the Mason-Dixon Line. . This left New York unprotected and raised the question as to how the draft selection would take place without military presence. . Just three weeks after Robert Mulliners' lynching saw the outbreak of the New York City Draft Riots.

Significance
The marginalization of the Irish-Americans and immigrants only served to strengthen the ideals of white supremacy. This also sheds light on the idea of 'whiteness', when Irish people immigrated to the United States, they would be legally recognized as white, however, they would not fall under the, "American ideal of a group of people fit for government."  Thus, in order to be seen as white and not just Irish, constant violence and riots was the answer as it showcased the Irish community as superior to that of African Americans. African Americans and Irish-Americans were pitted against one another yet they both shared the same desire not be marginalized.

Notes

References

1863 deaths
1863 murders in the United States
1863 in New York (state)
Lynching victims in the United States
Lynching deaths in New York (state)
Murdered African-American people
People murdered in New York (state)
Prisoners murdered in custody

June 1863 events
Crimes in New York (state)

Racially motivated violence against African Americans

African-American history between emancipation and the civil rights movement
Anti-black racism in the United States
African-American history of New York (state)
History of racism in New York (state)
Year of birth missing